Gadelshino (Ğäźelşa) is a rural locality (a village) in Nauruzovsky Selsoviet, Uchalinsky District, Bashkortostan, Russia. The population was 16 as of 2010. There is 1 street.

Geography 
Gadelshino is located 48 km southwest of Uchaly (the district's administrative centre) by road. Novobayramgulovo is the nearest rural locality.

References 

Rural localities in Uchalinsky District